Bill Zwaan (born November 9, 1954) in an American football coach, former football player, and former baseball coach. He is the head football coach at West Chester University, a position he has held since 2003. Zwaan was the head football coach at Widener University from 1997 to 2002.  He served as the head baseball coach at the United States Merchant Marine Academy from 1983 to 1984 and at Widener from 1993 to 1996.

Head coaching record

College football

See also
 List of college football coaches with 200 wins

References

External links
 West Chester profile

1954 births
Living people
American football quarterbacks
Cincinnati Bearcats football coaches
Delaware Fightin' Blue Hens football players
Merchant Marine Mariners baseball coaches
Merchant Marine Mariners football coaches
West Chester Golden Rams football coaches
Widener Pride baseball coaches
Widener Pride football coaches
High school football coaches in Florida
High school football coaches in Pennsylvania
People from Haverford Township, Pennsylvania
Coaches of American football from Pennsylvania
Players of American football from Pennsylvania